Yearning (1995) is a collaborative album by ambient musician Robert Rich and sarod player Lisa Moskow. It is based on the classical Indian musical form known as alap. Alap is the first and slowest section of a raga. The music on this album consists of Moskow’s sarod solos set against Rich’s classic droning ambiences.

Track listing
”part 1: Bija” – 10:30
”part 2: Suspension” – 9:50
”part 3: Nada” – 8:50
”part 4: Kali” – 7:50
”part 5: A Thousand Tears” – 11:40
”part 6: The Mirror” – 10:56

Personnel
Robert Rich – flutes, electronics, gliss guitar, santur, percussion, sound design
Lisa Moskow – sarod

References

External links
Hearts of Space Records Album Page

Robert Rich (musician) albums
1994 albums
Hearts of Space Records albums
Collaborative albums